The Eagle Creek Fire was a destructive wildfire in the Columbia River Gorge, largely in the U.S. state of Oregon, with smaller spot-fires in Washington. The fire was started on September 2, 2017, by a 15-year-old boy igniting fireworks during a burn ban. The fire burned 50,000 acres, and burned for three months, before being declared completely contained. As late as May 29, 2018, it was still found smoldering in some areas.

Timeline
By September 28, 2017, the fire had consumed  and was 46% contained. In late October, fire growth was slowed by rain. On November 30, 2017, the fire was declared fully contained but not yet completely out.

In mid-September 2017, highway closures and local evacuations were gradually being lifted.

A six-mile stretch of the Historic Columbia River Highway between Bridal Veil and Ainsworth State Park, a section providing access to many popular scenic destinations such as Multnomah Falls, remained closed until November 2018.  About 9,000 trees in danger of falling on the road were cut, and more than 3,000 feet of protective fencing was installed before the historic road was deemed safe for public travel, according to the Oregon Department of Transportation.

Several popular hiking trails were reopened to the public in November 2018, but as of May 2019, many trails heavily damaged by the fire remain closed, and officials with the U.S. Forest Service say there's no timeline for when some will reopen.   "Some areas may stay closed for years," said Rachel Pawlitz, public information officer with the Columbia River Gorge National Scenic Area.  These heavily damaged trails include the very popular Horsetail Falls, Wahclella Falls, Oneonta Gorge, and Eagle Creek Trails, among others.

Cause
On September 5, Oregon State Police announced that it had identified the person suspected of starting the wildfire, through the use of fireworks that were illegally set off, as a 15-year-old boy from Vancouver, Washington. A witness reported seeing a group of teenagers recording the fireworks being lit and thrown into Eagle Creek Canyon.

It was announced on September 8 that Oregon State Police had obtained cellphone video footage from one of the teenagers who had watched while a 15-year-old Vancouver boy threw a smoking firecracker, allegedly igniting the Eagle Creek Fire. Public Information Officer Capt. Bill Fugate says "the video will be released through the public records request process once the investigation is closed and the case is adjudicated, if charges are filed", reported Willamette Week.

The teen was sentenced in February 2018 to five years of probation and 1,920 hours of community service with the U.S. Forest Service. He also was ordered to write apology letters to 152 people trapped on the Eagle Creek trail because of the spreading flames, the city of Cascade Locks, the Forest Service, Oregon State Parks, the Oregon Department of Transportation, the Confederated Tribes of Warm Springs, the Columbia River Intertribal Fish Commission and many others.

On May 21, 2018, a judge ordered the 15-year old to pay more than $36 million  in restitution, which includes more than $21 million on behalf of the U.S. Forest Service, $12.5 million to the Oregon Department of Transportation, more than $1.6 million to the Oregon State Fire Marshal, more than $1 million to Union Pacific Railroad and varying amounts to Oregon State Parks, Allstate Insurance and a woman who lost her home in the fire. In his sentencing, Judge John A Olsen stated that the terms of the repayment were for a payment plan lasting for ten years, provided that the offender completed five years of probation and did not commit any crimes in the ten-year period.

Events

The Eagle Creek Fire was reported on September 2 at 4:00p.m. in the Columbia River Gorge. On September 5, the fire hopped over the Columbia River into Washington state, near Archer Mountain. The fire trapped 153 hikers and forced them to stay overnight six miles up the trail, trapped on the other side by the Indian Creek Fire. The first rescuer, a Forest Service ranger named Sharon, reached the hikers around 10p.m. An attempt to drop supplies to the hikers, and to airlift out the youngest children, was aborted because the narrow terrain and night made the maneuver too hazardous. The hikers—who generally had been on a hot summer day hike—huddled together and tried to sleep on the bare ground. Several additional staff from the Forest Service and the Hood River Crag Rats arrived overnight with space blankets and some provisions. The next morning, Crag Rats, Pacific Northwest Search and Rescue, along with Mountain Wave Search and Rescue, escorted the hikers out to Wahtum Lake and bussed them back to the Eagle Creek Trailhead.

The community of Cascade Locks, Oregon was the first to experience mandatory evacuations, with 283 structures, including 15 businesses, being threatened by the fire. Salmon hatcheries at Cascade Locks were forced to release 600,000 fish six months earlier than expected. The fire also threatened historic structures in the Eagle Creek Day Use Area, specifically those built by the Civilian Conservation Corps in the 1930s. The fire also threatened the Multnomah Falls Lodge, which was saved by water tenders.

As of September 27, the Eagle Creek Fire had burned  and was 46% contained. Rainfall during previous days had significantly contained and newly downgraded the fire. The Incident Command Post was relocated from Hood River County Fairgrounds to the Best Western Columbia River Inn in Cascade Locks.

Merge of Eagle Creek and Indian Creek Fires
In the early hours of September 6, the Eagle Creek Fire merged with the Indian Creek Fire. Fire officials estimated that, together, over 31,000 acres were actively burning.

The Office of the Oregon State Fire Marshal issued the following statement:

The following day, September 7, circumstances led Simmons to update his statement to "There is significant damage to the trails... it's going to take a while for them to recover."

Air quality downgrades
Westward winds blew smoke and up to one inch of ash on the Portland metro area during 4 and 5 September. Air quality was officially reduced to an "unhealthy" rating due to smoke and falling ash, forcing many schools to close or cancel outdoor activities.

On Friday, September 15, smoky conditions resumed throughout the Portland Metro area, accompanied by far less falling ash than previously, but downgrading air quality to an "unhealthy" rating again on Saturday, 16 September. Shifting wind conditions and subsequent rain on Sunday, September 17 cleared skies and aided in fire containment. Many schools were also affected by smoke, causing children to miss school on many occasions.

Evacuations and closures

Cascade Locks, Oregon was the first area of mandatory evacuation. As of September 5, a number of communities in the area were added to mandatory evacuation. In Multnomah County, mandatory evacuation orders were in place for Larch Mountain, and the communities of Latourell, Bridal Veil, Dodson, Warrendale, and East Corbett. "Get Set" evacuations were in place for Corbett and Springdale. An evacuation shelter was established at Mt. Hood Community College.

The Columbia River itself was also closed to all marine traffic for 20 miles, from mile marker 126 to 146. The I-84 corridor from Troutdale, Oregon to Hood River, Oregon, continued to be an active evacuation zone as of September 12.

A total of 400 residences were under mandatory evacuation notices. In Hood River County, mandatory evacuations are in place for all areas south of Interstate 84 in Cascade Locks. The rest of Cascade Locks was at "Get Set" evacuation level on September 5. Meanwhile, in Skamania County, Washington, there were mandatory evacuations for Archer Mountain Road, Smith Cripe and Deville Road. Mabee Mines Road was also at a "Get Set" evacuation level at that time.

As of September 9, 2017, the Oregon State Fire Marshal (OSFM) task force was on alert for potential evacuation of Lost Lake and Mitchell Point.

In mid-September 2017, highway closures and local evacuations were gradually being lifted.[9]

A six-mile stretch of the Historic Columbia River Highway between Bridal Veil and Ainsworth State Park, a section providing access to many popular scenic destinations such as Multnomah Falls, remained closed until November 2018. About 9,000 trees in danger of falling on the road were cut, and more than 3,000 feet of protective fencing was installed before the historic road was deemed safe for public travel, according to the Oregon Department of Transportation.

Several popular hiking trails were reopened to the public in November 2018, but as of May 2019, many trails heavily damaged by the fire remain closed, and officials with the U.S. Forest Service say there's no timeline for when some will reopen. "Some areas may stay closed for years," said Rachel Pawlitz, public information officer with the Columbia River Gorge National Scenic Area. These heavily damaged trails include the very popular Horsetail Falls, Wahclella Falls, Oneonta Gorge, and Eagle Creek Trails, among others.

Containment
On November 3, 2017, the U.S. Forest Service listed an "Estimated Containment Date" for the Eagle Creek Fire of November 30.  On November 30, 2017, the fire was declared 100 percent contained but not yet completely out.

By September 22, 2018, the fire was considered extinguished, though closures in the area continued.

References

External links

 

2017 in Oregon
2017 Oregon wildfires
2017 Washington (state) wildfires
Columbia River Gorge
October 2017 events in the United States
September 2017 events in the United States